There are over 20,000 Grade II* listed buildings in England. This page is a list of these buildings in the district of Nuneaton and Bedworth in Warwickshire.

Nuneaton and Bedworth

|}

Notes

External links

Nuneaton and Bedworth
 
Nuneaton and Bedworth